Cundall may refer to:

Cundall, North Yorkshire, a hamlet in England
Cundall Johnston and Partners, a multi-disciplinary Engineering Consultancy
Peter Cundall (1927–2021), horticulturalist and television personality in Australia
James Cundall (born 1959), British Theatrical Producer
Joseph Cundall (1818–1895), Victorian English writer, under the pseudonym of "Stephen Percy"

See also 
 Cundell